Kali soda may refer to:

 Kali soda Scop., a synonym of Salsola soda
 Kali soda Moench, an invalid name and synonym of Kali turgida